Phanoptis taxila is a moth of the family Notodontidae first described by Herbert Druce in 1907. It is found in Colombia.

References

Moths described in 1907
Notodontidae of South America